VH1 Behind the Music: The Daryl Hall and John Oates Collection is a compilation album by Hall & Oates. Behind the Music is a TV series that aired on VH1 and this compilation was released in connection with a Hall & Oates episode. It features 3 new (at the time) studio tracks and a few new live recordings. Two of the three new songs ("Heartbreak Time," and "Do It for Love") were recorded for Hall & Oates next album, Do It For Love. It also features an acoustic re-recording of "Someone Like You" (retitled "Somebody Like You" for this release) from Hall's 1986 solo album Three Hearts in the Happy Ending Machine.

Track listing
"Sara Smile"  (Hall, Oates)  (3:09)
"Rich Girl"  (Hall)  (2:26)
"Do What You Want, Be What You Are"  (Hall, Oates)  (4:36)
"You Make My Dreams"  (Allen, Hall, Oates)  (3:07)
"I Can't Go for That (No Can Do)"  (Allen, Hall, Oates)  (5:09)
"One on One"  (Hall)  (4:19)
"Maneater"  (Allen, Hall, Oates)  (4:32)
"Say It Isn't So"  (Hall)  (4:18)
"Out of Touch"  (Hall, Oates)  (4:26)
"Everything Your Heart Desires"  (Hall)  (5:19)
"Kiss on My List" (live)  (Allen, Hall)  (4:37)
"She's Gone" (live)  (Hall, Oates)  (5:23)
"So Close" (Unplugged version)  (Bon Jovi, Green, Hall, Kortchmar) (4:52)
"Everytime You Go Away" (live)  (Hall)  (9:14)
"Somebody Like You" (New recording of Hall's solo song "Someone Like You")  (Hall)  (5:53)
"Heartbreak Time" (New song) (Barry, Oates, Taylor, Torch)  (4:09)
"Do It for Love" (New song) (Hall, Mann, Oates, Pesco) (3:58)

Notes 

2002 greatest hits albums
Hall & Oates compilation albums
RCA Records compilation albums